NELLA Linhas Aéreas Ltda, also known as NELLA, is a planned Brazilian low-cost airline to be based at Brasília International Airport. It plans to start operations during 2022.

NELLA has intentions to operate cargo flights in the future with a Boeing 737-400F.

History
Currently, NELLA Linhas Aéreas it is in the certification phase, which includes the preparation of operational manuals and their evaluation. However, as of May 2022 the certification process is dormant.

On July 19, 2021, NELLA Linhas Aéreas announced the purchase of Albatros Airlines. Now Albatros Airlines has a new corporate image and trade name, as Albatros Airlines by Nella.

On August 10, 2021, NELLA Linhas Aéreas announced the purchase of Línea Aérea Amaszonas, a Bolivian airline, for U$50 million, that anticipated the operations of NELLA Linhas Aéreas.

In November 2021, NELLA Linhas Aéreas announced its strategy of expanding operations with the re-launch of Líneas Aéreas Paraguayas.

In February 2023, it emerged that NELLA Linhas Aéreas has acquired Mexican carrier, Aeromar, according to logo rebrands. The deal is not officially confirmed.

Destinations
NELLA Linhas Aéreas has been planning to fly to 78 different airports in Brazil. But as of February 2023, no operations have been initiated.

Fleet
The fleet of NELLA Linhas Aéreas may include the following aircraft:

See also
List of airlines of Brazil

References

External links
 Official website

Airlines of Brazil
Airlines established in 2020
2020 establishments in Brazil
Low-cost carriers
Companies of Brazil